Schaereria albomarginata is a species of saxicolous (rock-dwelling) lichen in the family Schaereriaceae. Found in continental Antarctica, it was formally described as a new species in 2009 by Norwegian lichenologist Dag Øvstedal. Here the lichen was found growing in rock fissures. The areolae are brown with a prominent white margin; this feature is referred to in the specific epithet albomarginata. Its ascospores are simple, colourless, and more or less spherical, measuring about 7 μm in diameter. No lichen products were detected in the specimen.

References

Lecanoromycetes
Lichen species
Lichens described in 2009
Lichens of Antarctica